Don Barclay (born Donn Van Tassel Barclay, December 26, 1892 – October 16, 1975) was an American actor, artist and caricaturist whose many roles stretched the period from the Keystone Cops in 1915 to Mary Poppins in 1964 and whose many paintings and caricatures of celebrities filled establishments worldwide and are archived in the Library of Congress.

Career
The more experienced comedian, Don Barclay helped and later became roommates with a rookie actor in Bristol, England named Archie Leach. Barclay and Leach developed a two-man comedy show together in New York. Leach later became better known as Cary Grant and Grant rejoined Barclay beginning in 1920 in New York and Hollywood where they were often roommates. They remained lifelong best friends.

He started his career with the Ziegfeld Follies. Barclay portrayed hundreds of roles on films and voices for Walt Disney who considered Barclay a good luck charm. He is perhaps most recognized now for his portrayal of Admiral Boom's first mate, Mr. Binnacle in the Disney family film Mary Poppins. His character was a former Royal Navy bosun and next-door neighbor to the Banks family.

Artist/Painter
Barclay's paintings and caricatures are unique in that they often were painted on the movie lots themselves when he was working with the other actors.

Barclay eventually became such a successful artist caricature painter of celebrities on his movie sets that he eventually was making more money as an artist than as an actor and he left acting to become a full-time artist. He was prolific, turning out hundreds of caricatures of celebrities for saloons all over the nation as well as for servicemen in barracks. Many of his paintings were on display at the Masquers Club in Losa Angeles.

Two famous and noted examples of his painted caricatures featuring Bob Hope, "Old Four Eyes" and "Bob Hope and Elf", are featured on the official Library of Congress website devoted to Bob Hope (Old Four Eyes is mislabeled in attribution as "Dan Barclay" – "Bob Hope and Elf" is correctly attributed at the bottom of the LOC page).

Actress/director Diane Keaton purchased a clown painting by Barclay which led to her collecting clown paintings and the publication of the book by the actress called "Clown Paintings".

Barclay's large paintings are very rare and collectible as few of his larger works survive while Christie's and other high-profile auction houses have increasingly featured his smaller works such as his painting of Stan Laurel.

Bob Hope collected a series of ceramic mugs featuring Frank Sinatra, Joan Crawford, Jimmy Durante and Lou Costello produced by Barclay based on Don Barclay's caricatures which were auctioned at Julien Estates auction of the Bob Hope Estate in Los Angeles.

Additional rare Barclay celebrity mug collection pieces were found at Hake's Americana & Collectibles and are also included in the definitive Birnkrant Collection of Mickey Mouse & Comic Characters AKA "Mouse Heaven" collection made famous by a movie of the same name.

World War II
During the time preceding World War II Barclay spent time with General Claire Lee Chennault's 14th AAF famous Flying Tigers unit (then known as the "China Blitzers") where he illustrated every person in the group.

From October to November 1943, Barclay did a one-man USO show No. 302 for the troops; touring every base in North Africa, Arabia, India, and China with his act and drawing caricatures of the men as he went.  When he later returned to China in 1945 he estimated he had drawn over 10,000 caricatures of servicemen.

Retirement
In 1970 Barclay retired and bought a home in the Desert Park Estates neighborhood of Palm Springs, California, where he died.

Selected filmography

 That Little Band of Gold (1915)
 Honky Donkey (1934) as Mr. Barclay
 Frisco Kid (1935) as Drunk (uncredited)
 The Murder of Dr. Harrigan (1935) as Jackson – the drunk
 Man Hunt (1936) as Reporter Waffles
 The Lion's Den (1936) as Paddy Callahan
 Bengal Tiger (1936) as Comic Wrestler (uncredited)
 I Cover the War (1937) as Elmer Davis
 Behind the Mike (1937) as Sparky
 The Spy Ring (1938) as Private Timothy O'Reilly
 Thunder in the Desert (1938) as Rusty
 Accidents Will Happen (1938) as Martin Dorsey – Phoney Drunk Driver
 Outlaw Express (1938) as Sergeant Andy Sharpe
 Valley of the Giants (1938) as Drunk (uncredited)
 The Law West of Tombstone (1938) as The Professor – Texas Rose's Piano Player (uncredited)
 Sweethearts (1938) as Leo's Taxi Driver (uncredited)
 The Oklahoma Kid (1939) as Drunk (uncredited)
 The Flying Irishman (1939) as Bettor (uncredited)
 Badlands of Dakota (1941) as Joe (uncredited)
 Honky Tonk (1941) as Man with Feathers (uncredited)
 South of Tahiti (1941) as Tattooer (uncredited)
 Bedtime Story (1941) as Conventioneer (uncredited)
 Sing Your Worries Away (1942) as Luke Brown (uncredited)
 Blondie's Blessed Event (1942) as Waiter (uncredited)
 Larceny, Inc. (1942) as Drunk Bumped by jug (uncredited)
 This Gun for Hire (1942) as Piano Player (uncredited)
 Mexican Spitfire Sees a Ghost (1942) as Fingers O'Toole
 The Big Street (1942) as Eating Contest Emcee (uncredited)
 Mexican Spitfire's Elephant (1942) as Mr. Smith on the Elephants (uncredited)
 My Sister Eileen (1942) as Drunk (uncredited)
 The Falcon's Brother (1942) as Lefty
 Silver Queen (1942) as Drunk (uncredited)
 Pittsburgh (1942) as Drunk (uncredited)
 Frankenstein Meets the Wolf Man (1943) as Franzec
 After Midnight with Boston Blackie (1943) as Cigar Clerk (uncredited)
 The More the Merrier (1943) as Drunk (uncredited)
 Good Morning, Judge (1943) as Biscuit Face
 Thank You Lucky Stars (1943) as Pete (uncredited)
 Shine On, Harvest Moon (1944) as Coach Driver (uncredited)
 Once Upon a Time (1944) as Photographer (uncredited)
 In Society (1944) as Drowning Drunk (uncredited)
 Practically Yours (1944) as Don Barclay (uncredited)
 Having Wonderful Crime (1945) as Bartender (uncredited)
 Thunder Town (1946) as Bartender Nick (uncredited)
 My Darling Clementine (1946) as Opera House Owner (uncredited)
 Big Town After Dark (1947) as Gambler (uncredited)
 The Sainted Sisters (1948) as Dr. Benton (uncredited)
 Whispering Smith (1948) as Dr. Sawbuck
 Father Was a Fullback  (1949) as Grandstand "Coach" (uncredited)
 Cinderella (1950) as Doorman (voice)
 Alice in Wonderland (1951) as Other Cards (voice)
 Peter Pan (1953) (voice)
 Sleeping Beauty (1959) (As live action model for Disney animators to use as a guide) as King Hubert
 One Hundred and One Dalmatians (1961) (voice)
 Mary Poppins (1964) as Mr. Binnacle
 Bedknobs and Broomsticks (1971) as Portobello Road Passerby (uncredited) (final film role)

References

External links

 
 
 
 
 

1892 births
1975 deaths
American caricaturists
American male silent film actors
American male voice actors
Male actors from Oregon
People from Ashland, Oregon
Male actors from Palm Springs, California
20th-century American male actors